The 1890 Furman Baptists football team represented Furman University as an independent during the 1890 college football season. Led by H. C. Granger in his first and only season as head coach, Furman compiled a record of 2–0.

Schedule

References

Furman
Furman Paladins football seasons
College football undefeated seasons
Furman Baptists football